Chapter 5: Letter is the fifth album of South Korean pop music group g.o.d, released via SidusHQ on December 27, 2002. It was the last album released before the departure of Yoon Kye-sang from the group.

Reception
The group had opted to hold their "100-day Human Concert" series instead of regularly promoting their album on televised music programs and variety shows. Having been away from television for an extended period, sales dipped significantly compared to the fourth album and only one song won first place on a music program. "0%", one of the promoted songs, won first place on Inkigayo.

Track listing

Charts and sales

Monthly charts

Year-end charts

Sales

References

External links
Album Information — Mnet
Chapter 5: Letter on iTunes

G.o.d albums
2002 albums
Korean-language albums